Audun Egil Garshol (born 9 November 1951) is a Norwegian sprint runner. He was born in Ulsteinvik. He competed in 100 metres and 200 metres at the 1972 Summer Olympics in Munich, reaching the quarter finals in both events.

On August 12, 1972 in Stavanger, he set a Norwegian record with a time of 10.2 seconds, which was the country's last record before the introduction of electronic timing. On August 31, 1972, in Munich, he set the first Norwegian record after the introduction of the new measuring method with a time of 10.55 seconds. On September 19, 1973 in Sofia with a time of 10.52 seconds, he broke his own record. The result held the national record until May 20, 1986, when it was beaten by 0.01 seconds by Einar Sagli. One of his records, 10.49 s (Munich, August 31, 1972), was not recognized because it was set in too strong a wind.

References

External links

1951 births
Living people
People from Ulstein
Sportspeople from Møre og Romsdal
Norwegian male sprinters
Olympic athletes of Norway
Athletes (track and field) at the 1972 Summer Olympics